Drømtorp Station was located at Drømtorp in Ski, Norway on the Østfold Line. The railway station was served by the Oslo Commuter Rail line 560 from Oslo Central Station. The station was opened in 1932 and closed in 2012

Railway stations in Ski, Norway
Railway stations on the Østfold Line
Railway stations opened in 1932
Railway stations closed in 2012
1932 establishments in Norway
2012 disestablishments in Norway
Disused railway stations in Norway